Penela is a municipality located in Coimbra District, in Portugal. It contains the town of Penela with about 3,300 inhabitants. The town's main tourist attraction is the Penela Castle. The population of the municipality in 2011 was 5,983, in an area of 134.80 km². It is among the oldest recognized municipalities in the whole country (1137).

Parishes
Administratively, the municipality is divided into 4 civil parishes (freguesias):
 Cumeeira
 Espinhal
 Podentes
 São Miguel, Santa Eufémia e Rabaçal (town)

Notable people 

 António Arnaut (1936 in Penela – 2018) a Portuguese poet, fiction writer, essayist, lawyer, politician and Govt. minister.

References

External links
 Photos from Penela

Towns in Portugal
Municipalities of Coimbra District
People from Penela